Doug Laing (19 March 1931 – 27 October 2014) was an Australian water polo player. He competed at the 1952 Summer Olympics and the 1956 Summer Olympics.

See also
 Australia men's Olympic water polo team records and statistics
 List of men's Olympic water polo tournament goalkeepers

References

External links
 

1931 births
2014 deaths
Australian male water polo players
Water polo goalkeepers
Olympic water polo players of Australia
Water polo players at the 1952 Summer Olympics
Water polo players at the 1956 Summer Olympics
Sportspeople from Shanghai